Silver Surfer is a comic book character.

Silver Surfer may also refer to:

 Silver Surfer (comic book), a number of eponymous series from Marvel Comics
 Silver Surfer (TV series), a television series based on the character
 Silver Surfer (video game), a Nintendo Entertainment System video game based on the character
 Silver surfer (internet user) a term commonly used for an older Internet user